Cybalobotys is a genus of moths of the family Crambidae.

Species
Cybalobotys kakamegae Maes, 2001
Cybalobotys manengoubae Maes, 2001
Cybalobotys nyasalis Maes, 2001

References

Pyraustinae
Crambidae genera